The Stranger is a South Korean film.

Plot
Chairman's daughter Kang Ae-ri was kidnapped on her marriage by two men who worked with her father's rival then she falls in love with Jae-gu who one of kidnappers.

Cast
Kang Seok-woo
Lee Hye-sook
Ha Jae-young
Bi Sang-gu
Lee Chi-wu
Choi Nam-Hyun
Kim Bok-hee
Sin Chan-il
Park Bu-yang
Han Tae-il

External links
 

South Korean romance films
1984 films
1980s Korean-language films
1980s romance films